Dan Ožvolda (born 11 October 1996) is a Czech professional footballer who plays as a midfielder for KFC Komárno.

Club career

Baník Ostrava
Ožvolda made his professional debut for Baník Ostrava against Sparta Prague on 6 December 2015. He appeared in the starting line-up and was replaced by Jakub Šašinka after 77 minutes. Baník lost 0-1 following David Lafata's first-half goal.

FK Pohronie
Ožvolda joined Fortuna Liga's Pohronie arriving from Vratimov. He debuted in first possible league fixture on 12 February 2022 at na Sihoti against AS Trenčín. He completed the entirety of the 3–0 defeat, following a first half penalty goal by Jakub Kadák and two second-half strikes by Eduvie Ikoba.

He scored his first goal for the Žiar nad Hronom-based club against reigning champions Slovan Bratislava on 19 February 2022 during a 3-4 home defeat. While Pohronie was up by three at half-time following Ožvolda's third-minute goal and two penalty strikes by former Slovak international Jaroslav Mihalík, Pohronie lost the game and Ožvolda was replaced by Ladji Mallé after 83 minutes.

References

External links
 
 Futbalnet profile 
 

1996 births
Living people
Czech footballers
Czech expatriate footballers
Place of birth missing (living people)
Association football midfielders
FC Baník Ostrava players
MFK Vítkovice players
FK Frýdek-Místek players
FK Pohronie players
KFC Komárno players
Czech First League players
Czech National Football League players
Moravian-Silesian Football League players
Slovak Super Liga players
Expatriate footballers in Slovakia
Czech expatriate sportspeople in Slovakia